Faran may refer to:

Places 
 Faran, India, a village in Katauli Khurd
 Faran, a village in Katauli Khurd
 shaikh Faran, a valley in Katauli Khurd
 Shaikh Faran, a Katauli Khurd location

People 
 James J. Faran (1808–1892), American politician
 Naila Faran (1978–2015), Saudi medic

See also 
 Faran Tangi, a village in Pakistan
 Farran
 Fəràn language, spoken in Nigeria